Muhammadu Buhari became President following the 2015 Nigerian general election. The following is a list of international presidential trips made by Muhammadu Buhari as the 15th President of Nigeria.

President Muhammadu Buhari has travelled out of Nigeria a total of 51 times since assuming office in 2015.

Summary of International Trips
Here is a summary of the countries President Muhammadu Buhari of Nigeria has visited as President. There are two trips that he made to the United Kingdom, one on his official vacation and one for medical treatment that are included in this list.

2015
The following is a list of international presidential trips made by Buhari in 2015.

2016
The following is a list of international presidential trips made by Buhari in 2016. Buhari makes a trip to the United Kingdom in February 2016 & June 2016, however, they were not in an official capacity and were for routine medical checkups.

2017 
The following is a list of international presidential trips made by Buhari in 2017. In January, May and September 2017, Buhari traveled to the United Kingdom, however, they were not in an official capacity and were for routine medical checkups.

2018 
The following is a list of international presidential trips made by Buhari in 2018.

2019 
The following is a list of international presidential trips made by Buhari in 2019. Between May 16–21, Buhari made a personal trip to Saudi Arabia to attend Lesser Hajj.

2020 
The following is a list of international presidential trips made by Buhari in 2020.

2021 
The following is a list of international presidential trips made by Buhari in 2021. In April 2021, Buhari made a visit to the United Kingdom, however, they were not in an official capacity and were for routine medical checkups.

2022 
The following is a list of international presidential trips made by Buhari in 2022. Buhari made two trips to the United Kingdom in May and November 2022, however, they were not in an official capacity and were for routine medical checkups.

2023 
The following is a list of international presidential trips made by Buhari in 2023.

References 

International presidential trips
Lists of 21st-century trips
Lists of diplomatic visits by heads of state
Diplomatic visits by heads of government
Foreign relations of Nigeria
Lists of diplomatic trips
Nigeria diplomacy-related lists